The 3rd Helpmann Awards ceremony was presented by the Australian Entertainment Industry Association (AEIA) (currently known by its trade name, Live Performance Australia (LPA)), for achievements in disciplines of Australia's live performance sectors. The ceremony took place on 19 May 2003 at the Star City Show Room. During the ceremony, the AEIA handed out awards in 35 categories for achievements in theatre, musicals, opera, ballet, dance and concerts.

Winners and nominees
In the following tables, winners are listed first and highlighted in boldface.

Theatre

Musicals

Opera

Dance and Physical Theatre

Other

Industry

Lifetime Achievement

References

External links

Helpmann Awards
Helpmann Awards
Helpmann Awards
Helpmann Awards, 3rd
Helpmann Awards